Graphic Era Hill University (GEHU) is a private university located in Dehradun, Haldwani and Bhimtal, Uttarakhand, India.

History

Graphic Era was founded in 1993 by Dr. Kamal Ghanshala and started with undergraduate programs in core engineering and allied sciences. It is situated in Dehradun, Uttarakhand. In 2008 the institute was accorded the status of deemed university. In 2015 Graphic Era was accredited by the National Assessment and Accreditation Council (NAAC) with grade 'A'.

References

External links
 Official website of Graphic Era Hill University

Universities in Uttarakhand
Educational institutions established in 2011
2011 establishments in Uttarakhand